The Small Man is a 1936 British drama film directed by John Baxter and starring George Carney, Minnie Rayner and Lilian Oldland. It was made at Cricklewood Studios.

Cast

References

Bibliography
 Low, Rachael. Filmmaking in 1930s Britain. George Allen & Unwin, 1985.
 Wood, Linda. British Films, 1927-1939. British Film Institute, 1986.

External links

1936 films
British drama films
1936 drama films
1930s English-language films
Films shot at Cricklewood Studios
Films directed by John Baxter
Films set in England
British black-and-white films
1930s British films